Booval railway station is located on the Main line in Queensland, Australia. It serves the suburb of Booval in City of Ipswich. It opened in 1876.

Services
Booval is served by trains operating to and from Ipswich and Rosewood. Most city-bound services run to Caboolture and Nambour, with some morning peak trains terminating at Bowen Hills. Some afternoon inbound services on weekdays run to Kippa-Ring. Booval is five minutes from Ipswich and 53 minutes on an all-stops train from Central.

Services by platform

*Note: One weekday morning service (4:56am from Central) and selected afternoon peak services continue through to Rosewood.  At all other times, a change of train is required at Ipswich.

Transport links
Westside Bus Company operate two routes via Booval station:
503: Bundamba to Riverlink Shopping Centre
514: Booval to Moores Pocket

References

External links

Booval station Queensland Rail
Booval station Queensland's Railways on the Internet

Booval, Queensland
Railway stations in Ipswich City
Railway stations in Australia opened in 1876
Main Line railway, Queensland